Max du Preez (born 10 March 1951) is a South African author, columnist and documentary filmmaker and was the founding editor of Vrye Weekblad. Vrye Weekblad Online or Vrye Weekblad II was launched on 5 April 2019  again with Max du Preez as editor.

Beeld 

Max du Preez is a writer, columnist and documentary filmmaker. Between 1982 and 1988, Du Preez was the Political Correspondent for various publications including Beeld, Financial Mail, Sunday Times and Business Day. He won the Nat Nakasa Award for fearless reporting in 2008.

Vrye Weekblad

Du Preez founded the Vrye Weekblad, an Afrikaans-language weekly newspaper, in November 1988 and its progressive successor Vrye Weekblad Online in 2019. During his tenure as editor-in-chief, the newspaper's offices were bombed and Du Preez received death threats as a result of the paper's opposition to apartheid.

He was sentenced to six months in jail for quoting Joe Slovo, the then leader of the South African Communist Party and a banned person.

The Vrye Weekblad broke the news of the Vlakplaas Death Squads and the role of its commander, Dirk Coetzee.

Dismissal from the SABC
In 1999, Du Preez was dismissed by the SABC from his position as the executive editor of Special Assignment, an investigative television show, after he objected when a documentary was barred from being shown. Though initially it was simply stated that his contract would not be renewed, the SABC later said he had been dismissed for gross insubordination.

The decision led to a public campaign to call for his reinstatement and the handling by the SABC led to complaints to the Broadcasting Complaints Commission of South Africa. The incident was seen as symptomatic of a public broadcaster voluntarily transforming itself into a state propaganda apparatus.

"Womaniser" remark
Rumours that then-President Thabo Mbeki was a philanderer
were controversially brought to light by a comment Du Preez made on a national radio show in 2001. During a discussion on the lack of examination of the private life of Mbeki, Du Preez said: "He is seen as a womaniser. It is publicly known and I think we should start talking about this, that the president has this kind of personal life. I'm not saying it's scandalous. He's a womaniser."

The remark was subsequently carried on the front page of The Citizen, leading to multiple complaints, apologies and a statement by a provincial branch of the African National Congress that it accepted "declaration of war by Max du Preez and his political masters who have unleashed an unprecedented vitriol against the ANC, its leadership, the President and its supporters."

Awards
 1991 - Louis M. Lyons Award for conscience and integrity in journalism
 1996 - Excellence in Journalism award from the Foreign Correspondents' Association of Southern Africa
 2006 - Yale Globalist International Journalist of the Year
 2008 - Nat Nakasa Award for fearless reporting

Further reading

References

External links
 Pale Native at Google Books
 Max Du Preez in conversation on the BBC World Service discussion programme The Forum
 Max du Preez Freedom Collection interview

South African writers
South African newspaper editors
Afrikaner people
Afrikaner anti-apartheid activists
Living people
Alumni of the University of Exeter
1951 births